Carlo Vigarani ( – 17 February 1713) was an Italian scenic designer who worked as  ("royal engineer") and then  ("intendant to the King's pleasures") at the court of the French king Louis XIV until 1690. He was born in Reggio di Lombardia and went to Paris with his father  in 1659. He is best known for his design with his father and his brother Lodovico of the Salle des Machines at the Tuileries Palace in Paris. He returned to Paris in 1662, became a French citizen in 1673, and probably died in Paris.

References

Bibliography 
 Baricchi, Walter, editor; La Gorce, Jérôme de, editor (2009). Gaspare & Carlo Vigarani: Dalla corte degli Este a quella di Luigi XIV, papers from a 2005 symposium held in Reggio Emilia, Modena, Sassuolo, and Versailles, in Italian, French, or English. Milan: Silvana Editoriale. .
 La Gorce, Jérôme de (2005). Carlo Vigarani, intendant des plaisirs de Louis XIV. Paris: Perrin. .
 Sheren, Paul; La Gorce, Jérôme de (2001). "Vigarani, Carlo" in The New Grove Dictionary of Music and Musicians, second edition, edited by Stanley Sadie. London: Macmillan.  (hardcover).  (eBook).
 Tollini, Frederick Paul (2003). Scene Design at the Court of Louis XIV: The Work of the Vigarani Family and Jean Berain. Lewiston: Edwin Mellen Press. .

1637 births
1713 deaths
Italian scenic designers
Italian emigrants to France
Artists from Modena
French scenic designers